Smith Sound is an uninhabited Arctic sea passage between Greenland and Canada's northernmost island, Ellesmere Island. It links Baffin Bay with Kane Basin and forms part of the Nares Strait.

On the Greenland side of the sound were the now abandoned settlements of Etah and Annoatok.

History
The first known visit to the area by Europeans was in 1616 when the Discovery, captained by Robert Bylot and piloted by William Baffin, sailed into this region. The sound was originally named Sir Thomas Smith's Bay after the English diplomat Sir Thomas Smythe. By the 1750s it regularly appeared on maps as Sir Thomas Smith's Sound, though no further exploration of the area would be recorded until John Ross' 1818 expedition. By this time it had begun to be known simply as Smith Sound.

In 1852 Edward Augustus Inglefield penetrated a little further than Baffin, establishing a new furthest north in North America.

References

Further reading
 Blake, W. 1999. "Glaciated Landscapes Along Smith Sound, Ellesmere Island, Canada and Greenland". Annals of Glaciology. 28: 40–46.
 Elton, Charles S. Movements of Arctic Fox Populations in the Region of Baffin Bay and Smith Sound. The Polar Record. [Offprint], no. 37–38. [Cambridge: University Press], 1949.
 Grist, Alexander, and Marcos Zentilli. 2005. "The Thermal History of the Nares Strait, Kane Basin, and Smith Sound Region in Canada and Greenland: Constraints from Apatite Fission-Track and (U Th Sm)/He Dating". Canadian Journal of Earth Sciences. 42: 1547–1569.
 Kroeber, A. L. The Eskimo of Smith Sound. [New York: Knickerbocker Press], 1900.
 Peary, Robert E. Northward Over the "Great Ice" A Narrative of Life and Work Along the Shores and Upon the Interior Ice-Cap of Northern Greenland in the Years 1886 and 1891-1897 : with a Description of the Little Tribe of Smith-Sound Eskimos, the Most Northerly Human Beings in the World, and an Account of the Discovery and Bringing Home of the "Saviksue," or Great Cape-York Meteorites. London: Methuen, 1898.

Straits of Greenland
Sounds of Qikiqtaaluk Region
Bodies of water of Baffin Bay
Ellesmere Island
Canada–Greenland border
International straits